Original Golden Hits, Vol. 1 is an album by Jerry Lee Lewis released on the Sun Record Company in 1969.

Background
When Shelby Singleton bought the Sun label from Sam Philips in July 1969, he began reissuing albums by former Sun stars Johnny Cash, Roy Orbison, Carl Perkins, Charlie Rich, and other lesser known artists.  What turned out to be a goldmine for Singleton, however, were the gobs of recordings Lewis had left behind at Sun, most of which had never been released.  With Lewis's return to the charts in 1968 with the country hit "Another Place, Another Time," and with Cash reaching the pinnacle of his stardom, Singleton wasted no time flooding the market with new compilations.  Retaining the original Sun logo but also employing vague themes, overdubs, and contemporary photographs of the artists, Singleton mined the archive for obscure cuts and alternate takes to create packages that became extremely successful.  Singleton also leased the masters to other labels, notably Charly in England and Rhino in the United States.

As the title implies, Original Golden Hits, Vol. 1 collects some of Lewis's biggest hits at Sun, including "Whole Lotta Shakin' Going On" and "Great Balls of Fire". The album became a top ten hit, peaking at number 8 on the Billboard country albums chart. As Lewis's phenomenal success continued in the country field, Singleton would tailor his Lewis releases to that market in 1970.

Track listing

1969 compilation albums
Jerry Lee Lewis albums
Sun Records albums